Tubero may refer to:
 Lucius Aelius Tubero
 Lucius Seius Tubero, Roman senator
 Ludovicus Tubero, historian from Ragusa
 Quintus Aelius Tubero (consul), Roman senator and priest
 Quintus Aelius Tubero (historian), Roman jurist and historian
 Quintus Aelius Tubero (Stoic), Roman jurist

See also